Anthony "Shake" Shakir, who also uses the aliases Sequence 10 and Da Sampla, is an American techno producer, best known for his contributions to Detroit techno.

Shakir began producing in 1981, and worked with Detroit musicians such as Derrick May and Carl Craig for many of their early Metroplex releases. Shakir appeared under the name Sequence 10 on the Virgin Records compilation Techno: The New Dance Sound of Detroit.

While many of his peers on the Detroit scene have worked to increase their profile in Europe, Shakir never gravitated toward this scene, working more closely with the second wave of Detroit techno musicians such as Mike Banks and Claude Young. He formed the labels Frictional in 1995 and Puzzlebox in 1996, the latter with Keith Tucker.

Among Shakir's credits are remixes for Telex and Inner City, as well as co-production of the Urban Tribe's 1998 album for Mo Wax, The Collapse of Modern Culture.

References

External links
 discography at Discogs
Anthony 'Shake' Shakir: Mr. Gone Is Back Again Interview at Resident Advisor
Detroit History: Anthony Shake Shakir  A brief history of Anthony Shake Shakir at Detroit Techno Militia

American techno musicians
Musicians from Michigan
Living people
Year of birth missing (living people)
Place of birth missing (living people)